Kathy Jordan and Anne Smith were the defending champions but lost in the quarterfinals to Bettina Bunge and Claudia Kohde-Kilsch.

Rosemary Casals and Wendy Turnbull, who lost the final of the preceding year, won this year's final 6–4, 6–4 against Barbara Potter and Sharon Walsh.

Seeds 
Champion seeds are indicated in bold text while text in italics indicates the round in which those seeds were eliminated.

Draw

Finals

Top half

Section 1

Section 2

Bottom half

Section 3

Section 4

External links 
 WTA 1982 US Open Women's Doubles Draw page 2
1982 US Open – Women's draws and results at the International Tennis Federation

Women's Doubles
US Open (tennis) by year – Women's doubles
1982 in women's tennis
1982 in American women's sports